All Our Mob (foaled 1989) was an Australian Thoroughbred racehorse who was a four-time Group One winner.  He was by What A Guest (IRE) out of All Sold (Northern Spring (IRE)-Tickets).  All Our Mob, who had always shown plenty of speed but a tendency to wilt over the closing stages, blossomed in the latter half of his four-year-old season, in the autumn of 1994.  This campaign featured a number of placings in high-class company, including the Doomben 10,000, and culminated with his first Group One win, in the Stradbroke Handicap.  The then Federal Opposition Leader, Alexander Downer, tipped All Our Mob in the race, and explained that winning was what 'All our mob is going to do' against ‘Mr Keating’ at the next election.  All Our Mob returned at five for a brief spring campaign, which included a second to Schillaci at Caulfield, and defeated Hareeba in the autumn's Newmarket Handicap.  Over the next two years, All Our Mob was placed in numerous Group One races, including the Epsom and Doncaster Handicaps and the Cox Plate, and recorded further Group One wins as a seven-year-old in the Mackinnon and the All-Aged Stakes.

See also
 List of millionaire racehorses in Australia

References

External links
  Gai Waterhouse's Hall of Fame
  Pedigree of All Our Mob

1989 racehorse births
Racehorses bred in Australia
Racehorses trained in Australia
Thoroughbred family 3-d